Henry Joseph "Pete" Darcey III (March 3, 1930 – August 31, 2009) was a center in the National Basketball Association. Darcey played with the Milwaukee Hawks before being traded along with Don Boven and George McLeod to the Baltimore Bullets for Stan Miasek and Dave Minor.

Darcey died in 2009.

References

1930 births
2009 deaths
American men's basketball players
Basketball players from Oklahoma
Centers (basketball)
Milwaukee Hawks players
Oklahoma State Cowboys basketball players
Sportspeople from Oklahoma City
Undrafted National Basketball Association players